Fort Peck Community College (FPCC) is a public tribal land-grant community college in Poplar, Montana. The college is located on the Fort Peck Assiniboine & Sioux Reservation in the northeast corner of Montana,  which encompasses over two million acres. The college also has a satellite campus in Wolf Point.

History
FPCC was chartered by the Fort Peck Assiniboine and Sioux Tribes in 1978. The decision to found FPCC was based on the reservation's need to provide opportunities for post-secondary education and community service in their home communities. In 1994, the college was designated a land-grant college alongside 31 other tribal colleges. FPCC was granted accreditation by the Northwest Commission on Colleges and Universities in December 1991.

Academics
FPCC offers 25 associate degree and vocational programs for local residents and businesses.  FPCC is a two-year degree-granting community college that offers programs to meet the career goals of its students and the training needs of the reservation:

 Associate of Arts, 
 Associate of Science, and 
 Associate of Applied Science degrees, and 
 one-year vocational training certificates.

FPCC also offers associate degrees and certificates in over 30 fields of study.

Partnerships
FPCC holds accreditation by the Northwest Association of Schools and Colleges, Commission on Colleges. The institution is a member of the American Indian Higher Education Consortium (AIHEC) and American Association of Community Colleges (AACC). The college is a member of the American Indian Higher Education Consortium (AIHEC) and American Association of Community Colleges (AACC).

FPCC's articulation agreements with four-year institutions Rocky Mountain College, Montana State University - Northern, and the University of Montana, allow students to earn bachelor’s degrees in 
elementary education, 
business, technology, 
information technology and 
psychology.

See also 
Janine Pease

References

External links
Official website

Two-year colleges in the United States
American Indian Higher Education Consortium
Educational institutions established in 1978
Universities and colleges accredited by the Northwest Commission on Colleges and Universities
Tribal Colleges in Montana
Education in Roosevelt County, Montana
Buildings and structures in Roosevelt County, Montana
1978 establishments in Montana